Edmond Demolins (1852–1907) was a French pedagogue.

Life and work

Edmond Demolins was born in 1852 in Marseille.
He became a disciple of Pierre Guillaume Frédéric le Play. 
He formed a small group of students including Paul de Rousiers  that met in Le Play's salon every Monday in the 1870s.
The Programme de gouvernement et d'organisation sociale d'après l'observation comparée des divers peuples (1881) was a collective work by members of the group with a preface by Le Play.
Demolins edited the bi-monthly Réforme sociale.
In 1885, three years after the death of Le Play, Henri de Tourville and Demolins split from the movement and founded a new journal, Science sociale.
They brought with them a few adherents including de Rousiers and Robert Pinot (1862–1926), future director of the Musée social and secretary-general of the Comité des forges.
This small group functioned as a true research team.

Edmond Demolins died in 1907 in Caen.

His most known works are L’Éducation nouvelle: L’École des Roches and À quoi tient la supériorité des Anglo-Saxons? (1897). In his work Les grandes routes des peuples, essai de géographie sociale : comment la route crée le type social, he defends racist theories.

Publications

 Histoire de France, depuis les premiers temps jusqu'à nos jours d'après les sources et les travaux récents T. 1, Les origines, Paris : Librairie de la Sté Bibliographique, 1879 
 Histoire de France, depuis les premiers temps jusqu'à nos jours d'après les sources et les travaux récents T. 2, La monarchie féodale, Paris : Librairie de la Sté Bibliographique, 1879 
 Histoire de France, depuis les premiers temps jusqu'à nos jours d'après les sources et les travaux récents T. 3, La monarchie moderne, Paris : Librairie de la Sté Bibliographique, 1880 
 Histoire de France, depuis les premiers temps jusqu'à nos jours d'après les sources et les travaux récents T. 4, La Révolution et les monarchies contemporaines, 3me éd, Paris : Librairie de la Sté Bibliographique, 1880 
 Le Play et son oeuvre de réforme sociale, 2e éd., Paris : bureaux de la Réforme sociale, 1884 
 Comment élever et établir mes enfants?, Paris : Firmin-Didot, 1893 
 À quoi tient la supériorité des Anglo-Saxons ?, 1897.
 L'Éducation nouvelle : L'École des Roches, 1998.
Les grandes routes des peuples, essai de géographie sociale: Comment la route crée le type social. Paris, Firmin Didot & cie, 1901. (Volume 1 also at Nabu Press, 2010 )
 A-t-on intérêt à s'emparer du Pouvoir ?, Firmin-Didot, 1905, 338 p.
 Les Français d'aujourd'hui - Les types sociaux du Midi et du Centre, Librairie de Paris/Firmin-Didot, s.d.

References

Sources

Further reading
Aires Antunes Diniz. A Escola Nova de Edmond Demolins segundo Sílvio Romero. pdf in Portuguese

External links 
 

French educational theorists
1852 births
1907 deaths
Writers from Marseille